I'll Wait for You may refer to:

 I'll Wait for You (film), a 1941 American drama film
 "I'll Wait for You" (Joe Nichols song)
 "I'll Wait for You" (Frankie Avalon song)
 "I'll Wait for You", a song by the Bicycles from the album Oh No, It's Love (2008)

See also
 I'll Wait (disambiguation)